is a former Japanese football player.

Club statistics

References

External links

1982 births
Living people
Toyo University alumni
Association football people from Yamanashi Prefecture
Japanese footballers
J1 League players
Japan Football League players
Tokyo Verdy players
Roasso Kumamoto players
MIO Biwako Shiga players
Association football forwards